Richard Newport was a medieval Bishop of London.

Newport was elected 27 January 1317 and consecrated on 15 May 1317. He died on 24 August 1318.

Citations

References

 

Bishops of London
13th-century births
1318 deaths
Deans of St Paul's
14th-century English Roman Catholic bishops